A war chest is a metaphor for any collection of tools or money intended to be used in a challenging or dangerous situation.  Historically, it referred to an actual chest located in the homes or barracks of soldiers or military leadership, in which arms and armor were stored. Traveling armies, such as that of Hannibal, collected the spoils of war and used them to negotiate with others to resolve conflicts through economic exchange rather than violence. In the modern era, the term refers to amassed funds, expertise, and/or equipment which allows a person or organization to survive a challenging situation.

Etymology

In arms and armor, a war chest is a container for the personal weapons and protective gear of a citizen-soldier, kept in the household, and is the origin of the term. The term's modern meaning originates with the medieval practice of having a chest, literally, filled with money to open in time of war.

In politics
In politics, a war chest is funding obtained from donors well in advance of a campaign, usually accumulated by an incumbent for either re-election or to contest a more advanced office, or provided by a wealthy candidate to their own campaign. The possession of such excess funds may discourage otherwise viable candidates from a primary or general election challenge.

In business
In business a war chest, or cash mountain is a stash of money set aside to deal with unexpected changes in the business environment, or to use when expansion possibilities arise.

Today companies can use accumulated cash or rely on quickly raised debt which costs less to carry when you don't need it. This is not always a reasonable substitute, as the credit available to a company typically drops as a result of the same actions that require the war chest to be opened.

Companies can redistribute their war chests to shareholders by issuing larger or special dividends, or more commonly through share buyback operations.  Companies do this because if actually held in cash, the companies will be earning a low rate of return in the money markets, whereas they could be using the funds to invest in more profitable projects.  If they continue not to invest the funds, shareholders may sell the company's shares and make it vulnerable to a takeover.  This would place the current management's jobs at risk.

In professional sports
In association football it refers to the amount of money a manager has been given by a club's chairman, owner or investors to acquire new players.

Related terms
Similar terms are also referred to as surplus cash, cash reserves, emergency reserves, acquisition funds, rainy day funds, or undistributed earnings within different contexts.

References

English-language idioms
Political terminology of the United States
Metaphors referring to war and violence